Carlos Zambrano Córdova (born July 12, 1984) is a Peruvian featherweight boxer. He has a residence in North Bergen, New Jersey. He is the grandson of Mauro Mina, who was considered the best Peruvian boxer in his time. He had an amateur record of 288 wins and 6 defeats (288-6-0).

Professional career

As a professional, Zambrano won the WBA interim featherweight title from Daniel Ramirez on March 28, 2015, and successfully defended it against Jose Sanmartin on August 1, 2015. He would lose the belt against Claudio Marrero on April 29, 2017. The vacant IBO featherweight title was also on the line in that bout.

Professional boxing record

See also
List of world featherweight boxing champions

References

External links

1984 births
Living people
Peruvian male boxers
Featherweight boxers
World featherweight boxing champions
World Boxing Association champions
Boxers at the 2007 Pan American Games